Dant may refer to:

Places
Dant, Kentucky, is an unincorporated community in Marion County, Kentucky, United States
Dant, Oregon, is an unincorporated community in Wasco County, in the U.S. state of Oregon

People with the surname
Adam Dant, British artist
Charles "Bud" Dant (1907–1999), American musician, arranger and composer
Jenni Dant (born 1982), American basketball player

See also
Cerdd Dant (string music), is the art of vocal improvisation over a given melody in Welsh musical tradition
Dant katha, ("tooth stories"), are Indian folk legends or fables